The 1984 UEFA European Under-16 Championship was the second edition of UEFA's European Under-16 Football Championship. West Germany hosted the championship, during 3–5 May 1984. Four teams entered the competition, after playing one qualifying stage and quarterfinals.

West Germany won the final against Soviet Union.

Qualifying

The final tournament of the 1984 UEFA European Under-16 Championship was preceded by two qualification stages: a qualifying round and quarterfinals. During these rounds, 27 national teams competed to determine the four teams that played the tournament.

Participants
 (first appearance) 
 (first appearance)
 (second appearance)
 (second appearance)

Results

Semi-finals

Third place match

Final

References
UEFA.com
RSSSF.com

 
1984
UEFA
Under
1984
May 1984 sports events in Europe
1984 in youth association football